Killjoy 2: Deliverance from Evil is a 2002 American slasher film and sequel to Full Moon's horror movie, Killjoy.

Plot
A young man, Nicholas “Nic” Gordon, is being chased by dirty cops Officer White and Officer Donnelly. When catch him, handcuff him, and plant cocaine on him so they can make the “arrest”. A week later, Nic and four other minor offenders; Raymond “Ray-Ray” Martin, Eddie Jasper, Cecile “CeCe“ Washington and the shy Charlotte Davis, are taken by detention officers Denise Martinez and Lieutenant Harris Redding to “Loxahatchee Canyon”. They are to spend 90 days at the location that’s “200 miles away” where they will be renovating a group home for fellow delinquents. On the way, their bus engine blows stranding in the middle of nowhere, at night, with no cellphone reception.

Redding takes the three men with him to search for cellphone reception. They happen upon a house and Ray-Ray breaks in when no one answers while Redding climbs a nearby hill in hopes of cell service. A gunshot is heard and Ray-Ray falls through the front door of the house, having taken a shotgun blast to the chest. A redneck local, Lilly, comes out threatening them to leave. She is about to shoot Eddie when Redding shoots her in the head. He tells them to get Ray-Ray back to the van while he searches for a phone. On the way back, they hear another gunshot, warning them that there are more rednecks out there. Believing that Redding is dead, the men quickly head back.

They get back to the van and find they have no medical kit with them. Warning the others about the rednecks, Martinez panics when she learns Redding may be dead and Nic takes her gun. The group leaves into the woods to find help. Eventually, they find another house belonging to voodoo priestess, Kadja Boszo, who tells them she can try to help Ray-Ray with her magic, but if he chooses to stay alive, he'll live, if he chooses to die, he‘ll die. Ce-Ce tells the group a story that her grandmother told her about, an evil spirit named Killjoy, a revenge demon who can be summoned through black magic. A boy named Michael summoned Killjoy but when Michael was killed, Killjoy used him to gain power by taking revenge on Michael’s killers, then destroyed Michael’s soul and disappeared. Nic and CeCe go outside to talk. Nic, intrigued and believing that Killjoy can help Ray-Ray, tells Ce-Ce he’ll give her cocaine if she can bring Killjoy to life.

After the ritual seemingly  fails, Nic says the deal’s off, but CeCe offers sex in return for the drugs which Nic agrees to. After having sex, he tells her he actually has no drugs and she leaves angrily. She goes to the outhouse when Killjoy appears and begins terrorizing her from outside the outhouse. Killjoy takes out his teeth, a pair of razor-sharp windup chattering teeth, and shoves them through a slot in the door. He listens and laughs as the teeth tear her to shreds then chatter their way back out where he puts them back in his mouth. Back inside the house, Nic arrives and gets told that Ray-Ray choose not to stay and now he's dead and Boszo took him outside. Martinez worries about CeCe and Nic leaves to find Boszo. Eddie leaves to get water from a water pump and finds CeCe’s mangled body. Killjoy emerges and using his telekinetic powers, lifts Eddie up off the ground and impales him onto the pump. He laughs maniacally while pumping blood from Eddie’s body from the pump.

Boszo, Nic, Martinez, and Charlotte begin to worry when Eddie and CeCe both have not returned. They argue about what to do and Nic leaves angrily when Boszo accuses him and CeCe of summoning Killjoy. Outside, he runs into Killjoy, he shoots him several times but it does nothing. Nic pulls out a knife but Killjoy makes Nic “carve a smile” in his own face, killing him.

Martinez, Charlotte and Boszo begin a voodoo ceremony to defeat Killjoy, blessing several jars of liquid on a table. Boszo and Martinez go into the woods to continue the ceremony where Killjoy slashes Boszo’s throat to stop her ritual and Martinez runs back to the house. Killjoy enters, knocks out Martinez and is ready to kill Charlotte when Redding comes in with a gun distracting him. Charlotte grabs the jars of liquid and splashes it onto Killjoy who screams as his face slowly melts. The next day, Charlotte, Ms. Martinez and Redding are taken out of the wilderness by a ranger.

Cast
 Charles Austin as Nic Gordon, a tough guy arrested by two crooked cops 
 Logan Alexander as Lieutenant Harris Redding
 Debbie Rochon as Denise Martinez
 Nicole Pulliam as Cecile “Ce-Ce” Washington, a young woman “fresh out of a 28-day stay, since the womb like mother, like daughter”
 Choice Skinner as Raymond “Ray-Ray” Martin, a young man “came up in the streets with Nic” 
 Olimpia Fernandez as Charlotte Davis, “a little, lost girl, started a fire at school, the whole school burned down” 
 Jermaine Cheeseborough as Eddie Jasper, a non-threatening young man who “considers himself a crusader for the African-American People; he’ll debate your ear off but he’s pretty harmless. He was just in the wrong place at the wrong time” 
 Babalda Francis Cledjo as Security Guard
 Tammi Sutton as Lilly, a hillbilly hermit
 Rhonda Claerbaut as Kadja Boszo, a powerful voodoo priestess
 Trent Haaga as Killjoy, a psychotic demon killer clown 
 Devin Hamilton as Ranger
 Wayland Geremy as Officer Donnelly, a crooked cop who arrested Nic
 Bobby Marsden as Officer White, a crooked cop who arrested Nic 
 Aaron Brown as File Clerk

Production
It only took 2 weeks to write the script and only 8 days to film. Trent Haaga, who played Killjoy, was initially embarrassed by his role in the film, only to return as Killjoy in the many sequels that followed.

References

External links
 
 

Killjoy (film series)
2002 films
2002 horror films
American slasher films
Horror films about clowns
2000s English-language films
2000s American films